Serdan may refer to:
 Serdan, alternate name of Sirdan, a city in Iran
 Serdán (disambiguation), various meanings, including as a surname